Mohammad Hossein Farhanghi (born 1961) is an Iranian conservative politician.

Farhanghi was born in Tabriz. He is a member of the 2004, 2008 and 2012 Islamic Consultative Assembly from the electorate of Tabriz, Osku and Azarshahr with Alireza Mondi Sefidan, Masoud Pezeshkian, Mir-Hadi Gharaseyyed Romiani, Mohammad Esmaeil Saeidi and Reza Rahmani. Farhanghi won with 188,642 (32.06%) votes. Farhanghi is a member the board of directors of the Parliament of Iran.

References

External links
 Farhanghi Website

People from Tabriz
Deputies of Tabriz, Osku and Azarshahr
Living people
1961 births
Members of the 9th Islamic Consultative Assembly
Members of the 8th Islamic Consultative Assembly
Members of the 7th Islamic Consultative Assembly
Followers of Wilayat fraction members
Members of the 10th Islamic Consultative Assembly
Academic staff of the Islamic Azad University, Central Tehran Branch